Pilocrocis calamistis is a moth in the family Crambidae. It was described by George Hampson in 1899. It is found in the Mexican state of Veracruz and Costa Rica.

The wingspan is about 32 mm. Adults are ochreous yellow, the forewings with a slight fuscous streak below the basal half of the costa and a curved antemedial line, as well as a speck in the cell and discoidal lunule. The hindwings have a discoidal spot and postmedial as on the forewings, but there is an oblique fuscous shade. Both the forewings and hindwings have a fuscous terminal line.

References

Pilocrocis
Moths described in 1899
Moths of Central America